The Battle Monument, located in Battle Monument Square on North Calvert Street between East Fayette and East Lexington Streets in Baltimore, Maryland, commemorates the Battle of Baltimore with the British fleet of the Royal Navy's bombardment of Fort McHenry, the Battle of North Point, southeast of the city in Baltimore County on the Patapsco Neck peninsula, and the stand-off on the eastern siege fortifications along Loudenschlager and Potter's Hills, later called Hampstead Hill, in what is now Patterson Park since 1827, east of town. It honors those who died during the month of September 1814 during the War of 1812. The monument lies in the middle of the street and is between the two Baltimore City Circuit Courthouses that are located on the opposite sides of North Calvert Street. It was sponsored by the City and the "Committee of Vigilance and Safety" led by Mayor Edward Johnson and military commanders: Brig. Gen. John Stricker, Maj. Gen. Samuel Smith and Lt. Col. George Armistead (of Fort McHenry).

The site of the former first Baltimore County and Town/City Courthouse (torn down in 1809) was originally designated as the location for the newly planned Washington Monument. Designed by Robert Mills (1781–1855), the cornerstone of the Washington Monument for Baltimore had just been laid on Independence Day, July 4, 1815. But fears that the designed shaft of the column would be too tall for the smaller open space of the old Courthouse Square, and might fall over onto nearby close-in townhouses, caused a last-minute change in location. The monument site for the nation's first president was moved further north of the city into "Howard's Woods" of the "Belvindere" estate of Col. John Eager Howard (1752–1827).

The monument, designed by Baltimore architect J. Maximilian M. Godefroy (sculptor to the Court of Spain) and built in 1815–25, is 39 feet (11.9 m) tall. The base of the monument is an Egyptian Revival cenotaph. It is an unusually democratic monument for the time in that it records the names of all who died, regardless of rank. The eighteen layers of the marble base represent the eighteen states that made up the United States at the time of the war. A griffin is at each corner of the base. The column, carved as a Roman fasces, is bound with cords listing the names of soldiers who died during the battle, while the names of officers who died are at the top.

The monument is topped by an 8 feet tall 2,750 pound Carrara marble statue by Antonio Capellano of a female figure representing the City of Baltimore wearing a crown of victory, holding a laurel wreath in one hand and a ship's rudder in the other. It was hoisted to the top of the column during the middle of the period of construction on the eighth anniversary ceremonies, Defenders Day, September 12, 1822. Colloquially called Lady Baltimore, the statue was relocated to the Maryland Historical Society on October 5, 2013, in order to preserve it from further damage caused by time and nature. It was replaced by a concrete replica. The monument is the oldest stone monument and first public war memorial in the United States.

The monument is depicted on the seal of the City of Baltimore that was adopted in 1827 and the city's flag adopted in the early 20th century.

The monument is erroneously depicted as being in Washington, D.C. in the 2007 film Live Free or Die Hard starring Bruce Willis, which had numerous scenes actually filmed in downtown Baltimore.

The Battle Monument was placed on the National Register of Historic Places on June 4, 1973. It is contained within the Business and Government Historic District and is within the Baltimore National Heritage Area.

See also

 Egyptian revival
 List of public art in Baltimore
 Washington Monument (Baltimore)

References

External links
, including photo in 1985, at Maryland Historical Trust website

 Battle Monument at Explore Baltimore Heritage
 Battle Monument: On Monument City
 Incredible 1846 Photo of Battle Monument - Ghosts of Baltimore blog

Baltimore National Heritage Area
Buildings and structures completed in 1825
Monuments and memorials on the National Register of Historic Places in Baltimore
Downtown Baltimore
Egyptian Revival architecture in the United States
Historic American Buildings Survey in Baltimore
Maximilian Godefroy buildings
Outdoor sculptures in Baltimore
Baltimore City Landmarks